Africa is a surname.  Notable people with the surname include:

 Dale Africa (born 1981), West Indian cricketer
 John Africa (1931–1985), born Vincent Leaphart, founder of MOVE, a Philadelphia-based predominantly black organization
 Keagan Africa (born 1985), former South African cricketer
 Melrick Africa (born 1978), Namibian rugby union centre and wing
 Susan Africa (born 1959), Filipino actress

Lists of people by surname